The Centre County Courthouse is a historic courthouse located in the Bellefonte Historic District in Bellefonte, Centre County, Pennsylvania.  

It was added to the National Register of Historic Places in 1976.

History and features
 The original section of the courthouse was built in 1805, with additions and / or remodeling in 1835, 1854–55, 1909, and 1963–64. It is a rectangular brick building on a stone foundation, measuring 135 feet long by 60 feet wide. 

The building is faced in stucco and has a gable roof topped by a cupola. It features a Greek Revival style entry porch with eight 26 foot high smooth faced columns with Ionic order capitals. The porch was added in 1835.  

Located in the Bellefonte Historic District, it was added to the National Register of Historic Places in 1976.

In June 2012, it was the site of the trial of Jerry Sandusky in the Penn State sex abuse scandal.

See also

 List of state and county courthouses in Pennsylvania

References

External links

Courthouse: Virtual Walking Tour of Bellefonte, Pennsylvania, Bellefonte Historical and Cultural Association website

1805 establishments in Pennsylvania
Buildings and structures in Centre County, Pennsylvania
County courthouses in Pennsylvania
Courthouses on the National Register of Historic Places in Pennsylvania
Government buildings completed in 1805
Greek Revival architecture in Pennsylvania
Individually listed contributing properties to historic districts on the National Register in Pennsylvania
National Register of Historic Places in Centre County, Pennsylvania